Euonymus phellomanus is a species of flowering plant in the family Celastraceae, native to China. It is one of several species within Euonymus called spindle or spindle tree. The fruits sometimes break open to reveal bright orange seeds. A notable feature is the rough corky bark which with age develops “wings” clothing the length of each branch. A similar effect is seen in the related Euonymus alata. This feature gives rise to a name occasionally used, the corktree (or cork tree).

In cultivation this hardy plant is very adaptable, accepting moist or dry soil in full or partial sunshine. In the UK it has gained the Royal Horticultural Society’s Award of Garden Merit.

References

phellomanus